The United Independents were a centrist oriented local body electoral ticket in Auckland, New Zealand. The group was formed in 1953 by combining a selection process for council candidates backed by several civic interest groups and lobby groups opposed to a proposed sewerage scheme. Its main ambition was to control the balance of power on the Auckland City Council and stop the sewerage scheme.

History
The United Independents group traces its origins back to a group of grassroot locals voicing their opposition to a council proposal to discharge Auckland's sewage into Waitemata Harbour, known as the 'Brown's Island' scheme. Lobbying tactics proved ineffective to stopping the scheme and so opponents turned to political action in order to dissuade local politicians. The most noted public opponent to Brown's Island, Dove-Myer Robinson, used his local renown from the issue and won an Auckland City Council by-election in 1952 and thereby gained membership to the Auckland Metropolitan Drainage Board and continued to criticize Brown's Island from within.

In the lead up to the 1953 municipal elections he helped form the United Independents, candidates who were independent of each other on all issues except Brown's Island on which they were all united. The United Independents won five seats and held the balance of power between the long established Citizens & Ratepayers and Labour Party tickets. The United Independents also endorsed John Luxford's candidacy for Auckland's Mayoralty. Luxford defeated incumbent Mayor John Allum, who was a supporter of the Brown's Island scheme. By allowing the Citizens & Ratepayers to appoint their preferred candidates to committee chairmanships they desired, the United Independents were in turn able to seize control of the Drainage Board and halt Brown's Island development. The United Independents then proposed an alternative scheme for oxidation ponds to be built in Manukau Harbour near Mangere which would break down the sewage naturally, a new technique pioneered in California, which was approved.

The 1956 municipal elections had less success for the United Independents. The group had fallen out with Luxford, who now stood for the Citizens & Ratepayers Association. The United Independents viewed Luxford as a traitor and gave their endorsement to Auckland's former Town Clerk Thomas Ashby, who defeated Luxford. However the United Independents themselves fared less successfully, losing two seats on the council and their hold on the balance of power. Further setbacks occurred when Ashby died suddenly. The United Independents did not contest the ensuing Mayoral by-election which saw Citizens & Ratepayers candidate Keith Buttle defeat Labour's John Stewart.

By 1959 the United Independents had merged with the Labour ticket and jointly contested that years municipal elections under the new Civic Reform banner. Robinson successfully contested the Mayoralty as an Independent, with informal support from Civic Reform.

Electoral esults

Council seats

Notable members
 Dove-Myer Robinson
 Ken Cumberland
 Eric Armishaw
 Thomas Ashby
 Val Chapman

Notes

References

Politics of the Auckland Region
Political groupings in New Zealand
Single-issue political parties
Environmental organizations established in 1953
Environmental organisations based in New Zealand
1953 establishments in New Zealand
1959 disestablishments in New Zealand